Bucyrus High School is a public high school in Bucyrus, Ohio, United States. The school is administered together with Bucyrus Middle School as the Bucyrus Secondary School, and serves students in grades six through twelve in the Bucyrus City School District. Athletic teams are known as the Redmen and the school colors are red and white.

Athletics

State championships

 Girls Softball – 1990

Athletic league affiliations
North Central Ohio League: 1919–1932, 1936–1945
Northern Ohio League: 1944–2002
North Central Conference: 2002–2014
Northern 10 Athletic Conference: 2014–present

Notable alumni
 Harry L. Martin, Medal of Honor recipient
 Walt Schupp, professional football player
 Cecil Souders, professional football player
 Edward Vollrath, U.S. Army brigadier general

External links

Notes and references

High schools in Crawford County, Ohio
Public high schools in Ohio
High School